Joseph Vincent McKee, Sr. (August 8, 1889January 28, 1956) was a teacher at DeWitt Clinton High School in the Bronx, New York, who  later became a politically active Democrat and briefly served as the acting mayor of New York City.

Life and career
McKee was born on August 8, 1889. He married Cornelia Kraft on November 27, 1918. He was a member of the New York State Assembly (Bronx Co., 7th D.) in 1918, 1919, 1920, 1921, 1922 and 1923.

McKee was a municipal judge from 1924 to 1926. In 1926, he was elected president of the New York City Board of Aldermen on the ticket with James J. Walker for mayor.

McKee became acting mayor of New York City after the resignation of Mayor Walker on September 1, 1932. Walker, who resigned amid scandal and the threat of a criminal indictment, subsequently fled to Europe until the danger of prosecution appeared remote. McKee, who was sometimes mockingly referred to as "Holy Joe", running as a write-in candidate, lost a special election to John P. O'Brien in November 1932 to fill out the rest of Walker's unexpired term as mayor. His four-month term as acting mayor of New York City ended on December 31, 1932.

In November 1933, McKee ran for mayor as the Recovery Party candidate against Democratic Mayor John P. O'Brien and Republican-City Fusion Party candidate Fiorello La Guardia, but lost to La Guardia. He served as a delegate to the Democratic National Convention in 1932, 1936, 1940, and 1944.

McKee died in 1956, following a heart attack. He was buried at the Gate of Heaven Cemetery in Hawthorne, New York.

See also
List of mayors of New York City

References

1889 births
1956 deaths
Burials at Gate of Heaven Cemetery (Hawthorne, New York)
Mayors of New York City
20th-century American politicians
Catholics from New York (state)
Politicians from the Bronx